Parvatagouda Gaddigoudar (1 June 1951) is a member of the 16th Lok Sabha of India. He also represented the 14th Lok Sabha. He represents the Bagalkot constituency of Karnataka since 2004 and is a member of the Bharatiya Janata Party (BJP) political party.

Early life
Parvatagouda Gaddigoudar was born on 1 June 1951 at a small hamlet Heballi in Bagalkot District to Balavva and Chandanagouda Gaddigoudar. He graduated in the faculty of Arts from Basveshwar Arts College at Bagalkot affiliated to the Karnatak University. Later, he completed his bachelor's degree in Law from the prestigious Raja Lakhamagouda College of Belgaum.

He married Savitra Devi on 6 February 1976 and continued to practice law at Badami.

Public life
He started his public life in the early 1980s and his major boost came when he was appointed by the then chief minister of Karnataka, Ramakrishna Hegde in 1987 as chairman of the committee to study the reorganisation of districts.
The report was implemented by J.H. Patel in 1997-98. He is considered instrumental in the creation of Bagalkot district, which was created after separating it from Bijapur. Parvatagouda Gaddigoudar was nominated to The Legislative Council of Karnataka in 1988. However, in 1994, he was unable to secure ticket from Janata Dal and contested the elections to the Assembly as an independent candidate.

Just before the elections for the 14th Lok Sabha, Gaddigoudar had denied allegations that he would be leaving All India Progressive Janata Dal (a splinter group of Janata Dal with allegiance to Ramakrishna Hegde) to join the Bharatiya Janata Party. However just before the elections, he did join the Bharatiya Janata Party with his followers and got the party's nomination from Bagalkot Lok Sabha Constituency. He entered the 14th Lok Sabha by securing 459,451 votes while his nearest rival, R.S. Patil of Indian National Congress, secured 292,068.

Positions held
 Member of the Legislative Council of Karnataka 1988
 Member of the 14th Lok Sabha
 Member of the 15th Lok Sabha
 Member of the Parliamentary Committee on External Affairs
 Member of the 16th Lok Sabha
 Member of the 17th Lok Sabha

Reference and notes

External links
 Affidavit furnished by Parvatagouda Gaddigoudar to the Election Commission while contesting the Lok Sabha elections 
 Member's home page on Parliament of India's Website 

1951 births
Living people
India MPs 2004–2009
India MPs 2009–2014
People from Bagalkot
Members of the Karnataka Legislative Council
Lok Sabha members from Karnataka
India MPs 2014–2019
Bharatiya Janata Party politicians from Karnataka